Diocese of Zadar may refer to:

 Roman Catholic Diocese of Zadar, previous name of the current Roman Catholic Archdiocese of Zadar (Croatia).
 Eastern Orthodox Diocese of Zadar, former common name of the current Serbian Orthodox Eparchy of Dalmatia, during the period when its seat was in the city of Zadar.

See also
Zadar
Catholic Church in Croatia
Eastern Orthodoxy in Croatia
Diocese of Šibenik (disambiguation)
Diocese of Zagreb (disambiguation)
Diocese of Požega (disambiguation)